Anatolis Alexis Sundas (born 22 January 1994 in Oradea) is a Romanian football player, currently playing in Italy for Serie D side Fidelis Andria, on load from Hungarian Budapest Honvéd FC.

Club statistics

Updated to games played as of May 3, 2015.

References
MLSZ
HLSZ

1994 births
Living people
Sportspeople from Oradea
Romanian people of Greek descent
Romanian footballers
Association football defenders
Budapest Honvéd FC players
Nemzeti Bajnokság I players
Romanian expatriate footballers
Expatriate footballers in Hungary
Expatriate footballers in Italy
Romanian expatriate sportspeople in Hungary
Romanian expatriate sportspeople in Italy
S.S. Fidelis Andria 1928 players